Downend is a settlement on the Isle of Wight, off the south coast of England. It is the location of the Robin Hill adventure park. According to the Post Office the population of the settlement at the 2011 Census was included in the civil parish of Arreton.

The hamlet lies to the north of the A3056 road, in the central-eastern district of the island. Public transport is provided by Southern Vectis on route 8 and Wightbus on 33.

Michael Morey, accused of murdering his grandson was said to have been hanged on the island and his body displayed in a gibbet opposite the Hare and Hounds pub. His ghost is still said to walk the street with an axe on his shoulder and in place of a face is a grinning skull.

Hamlets on the Isle of Wight